Straight from the Heart is a 2003 American made-for-television romantic drama film starring  Teri Polo, Andrew McCarthy, Patricia Kalember and Greg Evigan. The film is based on the romance novel by Pamela Wallace and premiered on Hallmark Channel on February 9, 2003.

Plot
Jordan Donovan (Teri Polo), a photographer from New York City, is set up with Tyler Ross (Andrew McCarthy), a Wyoming rancher, after her boyfriend fails to commit. It is arranged by her closest friend in NYC, and his sister through want ads in a magazine.

Jordan flies to Wyoming to meet Tyler, his sister Laurie and her fiancée. Although neither one is initially convinced (Tyler is initially put off by Jordan's city slicker attitude and she senses his hostility), they find themselves drawn to each other.

Jordan is quite a skilled horse-rider, having frequently exercised other people's horses with her father in Upstate New York when she was young. His hostility is an anger at the world and lack of closure for his wife who died with his unborn child in childbirth.

They bond through their shared love of horses and their passion for protecting the wild mustangs on and around his property.

Cast
 Teri Polo as	Jordan Donovan
 Andrew McCarthy	as Tyler Ross
 Patricia Kalember	as Laurie Woods
 Greg Evigan	as Edward Morgan
 Christine Tucci	as Carla Dimaggio
David Jean Thomas	as Jesse Syms (as David Jean-Thomas)
J. Kenneth Campbell	as Howard Jamison

External links
 
 

2003 television films
2003 films
2003 romantic drama films
American romantic drama films
Hallmark Channel original films
Films directed by David S. Cass Sr.
American drama television films
Larry Levinson Productions
2000s American films